Lost Village is a surreal festival experience that takes place in a secluded woodland near the village of Norton Disney, Lincolnshire. Festival-goers are invited to explore an abandoned world that encompasses dilapidated buildings, old junkyards, hidden gardens and a disused airbase. The four-day event focuses on forward-thinking music, art, food, immersive theatre, comedy, talks, drugs and workshops.

History
Lost Village was founded in 2015 by Andy George, Jay Jameson, Ben Atkins, Andy Ellis and Aaron Mellor; a group of friends who wanted to create a new creatively-led festival experience.

Location 
The festival is set in a heavily wooded location near Lincoln, and includes old cabins and dilapidated buildings. There is good public transport to the site.

Activities 
Lost Village is a creative project that changes and develops, year on year. The event emphasizes unpredictability, one-on-one experiences and abstract surrealism. There is space for about 18,000 participants, and the venue offers both rough camping and ‘boutique-camping’ on-site with various yurts, tipis and bell tents.  The event begins with a welcoming party.

Food 
Lost Village provides a range of  UK street-food as well as a tribal banquet experience. In 2016 this featured the Michelin starred chef Michael O’Hare and Typing Room’s Lee Westcott. 2016’s street food traders included Dalston's Voodoo Ray’s and bacon butty from London's Le Swine.

Artist and Performers

References

2015 establishments in England
Festivals in Lincolnshire
Music festivals in Lincolnshire